Giorgi Elizbarashvili (born Tbilisi, 24 January 1984) is a Georgian rugby union player who plays as a wing.

He played for Châteauroux and RC Blois, in 2005/06, in France, and for Krasny Yar Krasnoyarsk, in Russia, in 2007/08. He moved back to Georgia, where he has been playing for Akademia, from 2007/08 to 2010/11, and for TSU Lomebi, since 2011/12.

Elizbarashvili had 17 caps for Georgia, scoring 1 conservion, 2 points on aggregate. He had his first game at the 17-13 win over Russia, at 13 October 2002, aged only 18 years old, as a substitute, for the 2003 Rugby World Cup qualifyings, in Tbilisi. He wasn't called for the Georgia squad that participated at the 2003 Rugby World Cup, the first ever presence of the "Lelos" at the competition. He entered the 2007 Rugby World Cup qualifyings and was called for the final stage, playing two games, but without scoring. His most recent cap came at the 40-5 loss to Ireland Wolfhounds, at the Churchill Cup, at 14 June 2009, in Glendale. He has been absent from his National Team since then.

References

External links
George Elizbarahsvili International Statistics

1984 births
Living people
Rugby union players from Georgia (country)
Rugby union wings
Georgia international rugby union players